The 2014–15 Philippine Basketball Association (PBA) Philippine Cup was the first conference of the 2014–15 PBA season. The tournament began on October 19, 2014, and ended on January 21, 2015. The tournament does not allow teams to hire foreign players or imports.

Format
The following format was observed for the duration of the conference:
 Single-round robin eliminations; 11 games per team; Teams are then seeded by basis on win–loss records. Ties are broken among head-to-head records of the tied teams.
 The top two teams after the elimination round will automatically advance to the semifinals.
 The next eight teams will play in a double-phase quarterfinal round. The #3 to #6 seed will have twice-to-beat advantage against their opponent. Phase 1 matchups are:
 QF1: #3 team vs. #10 team
 QF2: #4 team vs. #9 team
 QF3: #5 team vs. #8 team
 QF4: #6 team vs. #7 team
 The winners of Phase 1 will advance to the knockout phase. The match ups are:
KO1: QF1 vs. QF4
KO2: QF2 vs. QF3
 The winners of the quarterfinals will challenge the top two teams in a best-of-seven semifinals series. Match ups are:
 SF1: #1 vs. KO2
 SF2: #2 vs. KO1
The winners in the semifinals advance to the best of seven finals.

Elimination round

Team standings

Schedule

Results

Bracket

Quarterfinals

First phase 
In this round, the higher-seeded team in the series has the twice-to-beat advantage.

(3) Alaska vs. (10) NLEX

(4) Talk 'N Text vs. (9) Barako Bull

(5) Barangay Ginebra vs. (8) GlobalPort

(6) Meralco vs. (7) Purefoods Star

Second phase 
This is a one-game playoff. The winner advances to the semifinals, while the loser is eliminated.

(3) Alaska vs. (6) Meralco

(4) Talk 'N Text vs. (5) Barangay Ginebra

Semifinals

(1) San Miguel vs. (4) Talk 'N Text

(2) Rain or Shine vs. (3) Alaska

Finals

Awards

Conference
Best Player of the Conference: June Mar Fajardo (San Miguel Beermen)
Finals MVP: Arwind Santos (San Miguel Beermen)

Players of the Week

Statistical leaders

Entire conference

References

External links
PBA Official Website
PBA-Online!

Philippine Cup
PBA Philippine Cup